The following is a list of international prime ministerial trips made by Prime Ministers of Italy in reverse chronological order.

Italian Republic (1946-present)

Giorgia Meloni (2022–present)

Mario Draghi (2021-2022)

Giuseppe Conte (2018–2021)

Paolo Gentiloni (2016–2018)

Matteo Renzi (2014–2016)

Enrico Letta (2013-2014)

Mario Monti (2011-2013)

Silvio Berlosconi (2008-2011)

Romano Prodi (2006-2008)

Silvio Berlosconi (2001-2006)

Giuliano Amato (2000-2001)

Massimo D'Alema (1998-2000)

Romano Prodi (1996-1998)

Lamberto Dini (1994-1996)

Silvio Berlosconi (1994-1995)

Bettino Craxi (1983-1987)

Kingdom of Italy (1900-1946)

Benito Mussolini (1922-1943)

See also 

 List of international trips made by prime ministers of the United Kingdom
 List of international trips made by presidents of Iran
 List of international trips made by secretaries of state of the United States
 List of international trips made by prime ministers of India

References 

Foreign relations of Italy
Italian prime ministerial visits
Italy diplomacy-related lists
Diplomatic visits by heads of government
Prime Ministers of Italy